Bait may refer to:

General
 Bait (luring substance), bait as a luring substance
 Fishing bait, bait used for fishing

Film
 Bait (1950 film), a British crime film by Frank Richardson
 Bait (1954 film), an American noir film by Hugo Haas
 Bait (2000 film), an American-Canadian action comedy
 Bait (soundtrack), the soundtrack to the 2000 film
 Bait 3D, a 2012 3D horror disaster film
 Bait, a 2014 British film directed by Dominic Brunt
 Bait (2019 film), a British drama film by Mark Jenkin

Other uses
 Bait (novel), a 2009 novel by Sieds Jetze
 "Bait" (CSI: Miami), an episode of the television series, CSI: Miami
 "Bait" (The Unit), an episode of the television series, The Unit

See also 
 Bayt (disambiguation)Bayt/Beit/Beth/Bet (disambiguation), meaning 'house' in various Semitic languages; part of many place-names
 Beit, a metrical unit of Arabic, Iranian and Urdu poetry
 The Bait (disambiguation), a list of films